The P-3AT is a locked breech, double action only, .380 ACP pistol introduced by Kel-Tec in 2003 and based on the P-32. The frame is made of polymer with an aluminum insert, and the slide and barrel are steel. It is the lightest production .380 ACP pistol in the world, weighing only  empty, and is roughly the same size as many .22 and .25-caliber pistols.

Design details
The P-3AT standard cartridge capacity is 6+1, and Kel-Tec also makes extended 7+1- and 9+1-round magazines for it. These attributes have made it popular for civilians with concealed carry permits and with police officers as a back-up or off-duty pistol. The P-3AT omits a slide stop to keep the size similar to the P-32. The similar size and weight of the P-3AT results in increased felt recoil over the P-32 due to the more powerful .380 ACP cartridge (the P-32 fires the smaller .32 ACP cartridge).

The Kel-Tec P-3AT is available with blued, parkerized, or matte chrome slide. The polymer frame is available in black, grey, navy blue, or olive drab green solid colors, as well as 'Urban Blue/Grey' and 'True Timber' camouflage.  Current production is the second generation model, with improvements over the first generation.  The most easily distinguished difference between generations is the extractor.  The first generation has a traditional external extractor parallel to the side of the gun, while the second generation has a button-head hex screw to the rear of the extractor, which is at an angle to the side of the gun.

In a 2004 Guns & Ammo review, Wiley Clapp said, "Ingenuity is often nothing more than a combination of existing principles applied in unique ways. Kel-Tec's new P-3AT has no single feature that is not established in modern pistol design, yet it has no competition in its niche." However, competitors soon introduced models with very similar features, including: the Ruger LCP, Kahr P380, S&W .380 Bodyguard and the Taurus 738 TCP.

References

External links
Official site
Instruction manual
 
Kel-Tec P3AT Discontinued in Lieu of Kel-Tec P15 - Firearms News: KelTec P15 9mm Pistol: New for 2022

Semi-automatic pistols of the United States
.380 ACP semi-automatic pistols